Albert Smoke (March 1894 – December 17, 1944) was a Canadian long-distance runner. He competed in the marathon at the 1920 Summer Olympics.

Smoke, a Mississauga Anishinaabe First Nations, was born in 1894 and was raised at Curve Lake. Smoke was only 4'10" tall, but was considered to be amongst the best long-distance runners of his era. Smoke was the national marathon champion from 1920 to 1922, and finished in third place at the 1922 Boston Marathon. He later moved to Lindsay, Ontario, where he died in 1944 at the age of 53. He was inducted into the Peterborough and District Sports Hall of Fame & Museum in 1988.

References

External links
 

1894 births
1944 deaths
Ojibwe people
First Nations sportspeople
Athletes (track and field) at the 1920 Summer Olympics
Canadian male long-distance runners
Canadian male marathon runners
Olympic track and field athletes of Canada
Sportspeople from Ontario